Rapids City is a village in Rock Island County, Illinois, United States. The population was 959 at the 2010 census, up from 953 in 2000.

Geography

Rapids City is located at  (41.581083, -90.344324).

Demographics

As of the census of 2000, there were 953 people, 352 households, and 280 families residing in the village. The racial makeup of the village was 98.53% White, 0.10% Asian, 0.10% Pacific Islander, 0.52% from other races, and 0.73% from two or more races. Hispanic or Latino of any race were 2.10% of the population.

There were 352 households, out of which 34.1% had children under the age of 18 living with them, 70.2% were married couples living together, 5.7% had a female householder with no husband present, and 20.2% were non-families. 16.2% of all households were made up of individuals, and 5.4% had someone living alone who was 65 years of age or older. The average household size was 2.71 and the average family size was 3.05.

In the village, the population was spread out, with 25.1% under the age of 18, 7.7% from 18 to 24, 28.3% from 25 to 44, 29.5% from 45 to 64, and 9.4% who were 65 years of age or older. The median age was 39 years. For every 100 females, there were 100.6 males. For every 100 females age 18 and over, there were 97.2 males.

The median income for a household in the village was $44,474, and the median income for a family was $50,893. Males had a median income of $43,125 versus $24,808 for females. The per capita income for the village was $24,499. About 0.8% of families and 3.0% of the population were below the poverty line, including 4.8% of those under age 18 and none of those age 65 or over.

References

Villages in Rock Island County, Illinois
Illinois populated places on the Mississippi River
Villages in Illinois
Cities in the Quad Cities